Alin Dobrosavlevici (born 24 October 1994) is a Romanian professional footballer who plays as a defender for Liga I club FC Argeș Pitești.

Honours
Dunărea Călărași
Liga II: 2017–18

References

External links
 
 

1994 births
Living people
People from Moldova Nouă
Romanian footballers
Romanian people of Serbian descent
Romania youth international footballers
Association football defenders
Liga I players
Liga II players
Liga III players
FC Dinamo București players
ACS Poli Timișoara players
LPS HD Clinceni players
ASA 2013 Târgu Mureș players
CS Concordia Chiajna players
FC Dunărea Călărași players
FC Hermannstadt players
FC Viitorul Constanța players
FCV Farul Constanța players
FC Argeș Pitești players